Uttaravalli or Uttaravilli is a village in Merakamudidam mandal, Vizianagaram district of Andhra Pradesh, India.

Geography
It has an average elevation of 80 meters (265 feet).

Demographics
According to Indian census, 2001, the demographic details of this village is as follows:
 Total Population: 	5,028 in 1,199 Households.
 Male Population: 	2,456
 Female Population: 	2,572
 Children Under 6-years of age: 617 (Boys - 317 and Girls and	300)
 Total Literates: 	1,878

References

Villages in Vizianagaram district